Blood 148 is a First Nations reserve in Alberta, Canada. It is inhabited by the Blood (Kainai) First Nation and was established under the provisions of Treaty 7. This reserve is managed from the community of Stand Off on its northwest border and encompasses the majority of lands bounded by the cities of Fort MacLeod, Lethbridge and Cardston. It is traversed by Alberta Highway 2, Highway 5 and Highway 509. The St Mary River and the Belly River are major rivers supplying and draining the lands.

At , this is the largest reserve in Canada, and the third most populous after Six Nations and Akwesasne. The judgement did not address remedy nor costs. It is located between the Cities of Fort MacLeod and Lethbridge and the Town of Cardston, bordering the Municipal District of Willow Creek No. 26 to the northwest, the Lethbridge County to the northeast and Cardston County to the east, south and southwest.

Demographics 
In 2006, Blood 148 had a population of 4,177 living in 1,250 dwellings, an 8.4% increase from 2001. The Alberta Government lists the Blood 148 population at 4,713 in 2018.

As of December 2013, the Blood 435 band, based on reserves 148 and 148A, had a total registered population of 11,791 per AANDC sources.

Government 

Under the Constitution Act, 1867, legislative authority over Indian reserves is placed exclusively with the national parliament and specifically Crown–Indigenous Relations and Northern Affairs Canada. The reserve is governed by a tribal council led by Chief Roy Fox (2016–present).

Blood Tribe Councillors (2019)

Dorothy First Rider (Itoomomaahkaa – Front Runner)
Floyd Big Head (Piitaika’tsis – Eagle Arrow)
Kyla Crow (Komiikakato’saakii – Round Star Woman)
Martin Heavy Head (Ponokaiksikksinamm – White Elk)
Joanne Lemieux (Aahkoyinnimaakii – Pipe Woman)
Robin Little Bear (Soyiikayaakii – Mink Woman)
Kirby Many Fingers (Apanssaapii – Counting Cue)
Hank Shade (Aapiisii – Coyote)
Lance Tailfeathers (Naatsikapoikkanaa – Two Stars Shining) 
Tim Tailfeathers (Naato’kisikapiohkitopiyi – Rides Two Grey Horse)
Marcel Weasel Head (Niitsayoohkiitohkitopiyi)
Franklyn White Quills (Makoyaapii – Wolf Old Man)

See also
 Beverly Hungry Wolf, writer
 List of Indian reserves in Alberta

References

External links
Blood Tribe
Map of Blood 148 at Statcan

Indian reserves in Alberta